Fayez Sayegh (1922–1980) was a Palestinian-American civil servant.

Early life
Fayez Abdullah Sayegh was born in 1922 in Kharaba, Mandatory Syria, where his father was a Presbyterian minister.  As a child, Sayegh moved with his family to Tiberias and went to school in Safed. He received his bachelor's degree from the American University of Beirut (AUB) in 1941 and his master's degree from the same university in 1945.

Career
Sayegh, along with his brothers who had joined earlier, joined the Syrian Social Nationalist Party in 1938. He was later expelled from the party after Antoun Saadeh returned to Lebanon in 1947, following his exile.

In 1949, he earned his Ph.D. in philosophy, with a minor in political science, from Georgetown University. After receiving his degree, Sayegh worked for the Lebanese Embassy in Washington DC. He also worked at the United Nations.

He taught at a number of universities, including Yale, Stanford, Macalaster College, as well as at his alma mater AUB and at the University of Oxford.

Sayegh found the Palestine Research Center in Beirut in 1965 and served as its Director-General. In that same year, the center published his historical study entitled Zionist Colonialism in Palestine.

He also made several appearances on American television as a commentator on the Israeli–Palestinian conflict.

Bibliography
 The Palestine Refugees (1952)
 The Arab-Israel Conflict (1956)
 Arab Unity: Hope and Fulfillment (1958)
 Communism in Israel (1958)
 The Dynamics of Neutralism in the Arab World: A Symposium (1964)
 Zionist Colonialism in Palestine, Research Center, Palestine Liberation Organization (1965)
 The United Nations and the Palestine Question, Facts & Figures Series, No 2, Research Center, Palestine Liberation Organization (1966)
 Discriminations in education against the Arabs in Israel, Facts & Figures Series, No 3, Research Center, Palestine Liberation Organization (1966)
 Palestine, Israel and Peace, Palestine essays, No 17, Research Center, Palestine Liberation Organization (1970)
 A Palestinian view, General Union of Palestinian students (1970)
 The Record of Israel at the United Nations

References

External links
"Where Do We Go from Here in the Middle East?", 60-minute video interview on Firing Line with William F. Buckley Jr.  (1974)
Fayez Sayegh, Zionism: “A Form of Racism And Racial Discrimination” Four Statements Made at the U.N. General Assembly, 1976. Reprinted by Americans for Middle East Understanding 
As'ad AbuKhalil, " Before Edward Said: a tribute to Fayez Sayegh", Al Akhbar, 2014-12-09
 Fayez Sayegh at University of Utah Digital Library, Marriott Library Special Collections

Arab Israeli anti-racism activists
People of the Israeli–Palestinian conflict
American people of Palestinian descent
1922 births
1980 deaths
People from as-Suwayda Governorate
American University of Beirut alumni
Georgetown University alumni
Palestinian academics
Macalester College faculty
Syrian emigrants to Lebanon
Lebanese emigrants to the United States
American expatriates in the United Kingdom
Members of the Executive Committee of the Palestine Liberation Organization
Academic staff of the American University of Beirut